Daniel Lennart Andersson, (born 18 December 1972) is a Swedish former professional footballer who played as a goalkeeper.

Club career 
Andersson played for clubs including Trelleborgs FF, AIK, Helsingborgs IF and Hibernian in Scotland. 

When playing in Scotland for Hibernian Andersson helped them reach the 2004 Scottish League Cup Final, which they lost 2–0 to Livingston. In the semi-final against Rangers he saved a Mikel Arteta penalty in normal time and then saved two further penalties in the shootout, from Michael Ball and Zurab Khizanishvili.

After retiring in 2015, Andersson came out of retirement - at the age of 45 - when he signed a short-term contract for the rest of the season with Helsingborgs IF on 28 September 2018, after first-choice goalkeeper, Pär Hansson, got injured for the rest of the season.

International career 
Andersson was capped once by the Sweden national team, in 2001.

References

External links 
 
 
 

1972 births
Living people
People from Bjuv Municipality
Association football goalkeepers
Swedish footballers
Sweden international footballers
AIK Fotboll players
Kalmar FF players
Hibernian F.C. players
Helsingborgs IF players
Ängelholms FF players
Allsvenskan players
Scottish Premier League players
Swedish expatriate footballers
Expatriate footballers in Scotland
Swedish expatriate sportspeople in the United Kingdom
Högaborgs BK players
Footballers from Skåne County